Quentin is a surname. Notable people with the surname include:

Carlos Quentin (born 1982), American baseball player
Caroline Quentin (born 1960), English actress
Charles Quentin (1810–1862), Wisconsin state senator
Léonce Quentin (1880–1957), French archer
René-Pierre Quentin (born 1943), Swiss footballer